The Iu Mien people are a Southeast Asian minority group considered a subset of the Yao people. Originally from China, they eventually migrated to  Vietnam, Laos, and Thailand, but many were displaced by the Vietnam War. As a result, many settled in the United States from the late 1970s to the mid-1990s. They speak the Iu Mien language.

History
The Iu Mien History starts with three levels of civilizations. The first: upper age (zaangc yunh zaapc -zaangv) consisted of 3,864 years of life cycle back. The second: middle age (zong yunh zaapc-zaangv) consisted of 1,800 years of the life cycle, and the third level lower age (haac-yunh zaapc-zaangv) consisted of 120 years of the life cycle. Today is known as (mouh-gitv ninh gen) consisting of 60 years of the life cycle. Iu Mien society counts 60 years as one generation of life. No record was documented in the three levels of the life cycle where Iu Mien lived. 

The Iu Mien cites the beginning of their civilization with King Pan or Bienh hungh. They believed he created the universe, earth, sky, and human beings, the creator of the world. In the year 1262, one document revealed that Iu Mien lived in the south and north of Hue Nan Hue Peic territories of Zu Jaang and Hu Jaang rivers bank were farming. These territories are also called: namh-ging ziepc bouv-dinc which means the southern part of China for 800 years. The yongh ziuh administration forced Iu Mien to move to live in an isolated region of the forest to build their own temples and continue to practice King’s role for 70 years. Yongh ziuh still allowed Iu Mien to be their own Kingdom by King Pan/Bienh hungh during the Mongol era (洪武). Yongh ziuh came to power for 8 generations and conquer China for many years. The yongh governments were weakening. The three Ming generals uprising against Yongh’s governments for several years then yongh’s government surrendered and the Mongols' system collapsed. There were many cities and provincial officials were removed from power. Ming (明朝)system and governments came to power for 17 generations. Ming’s era was the most aggressive toward the Iu Mien people. Ming sent troops to chase and hunt down thousands of Iu Mien high-ranking officials and civilians. Iu Mien people were almost extinct from the civilizations. Iu Mien people called and proposed Hm-geh baeng-maax to rescue Iu Mien from the Ming genocide. After proposing to Hm-geh baeng-maax, (powerful spirit god) Iu Mien troops gained power and were able to kill thousands of Ming troops, which made the Ming government open peace negotiations with Iu Mien. As a result of the negotiation, the Ming government no longer allowed King Pan/Bienh hungh to have his own kingdom, build their temples and continue the kingship role. The passport traveling in the hills/passport to travel across the mountain (jiex-sen borngv) was drafted and adopted. All lowlands that can be irrigated water for farming belonged to the Chinese. The foothills and highlands that no longer can be irrigated water for farming belonged to Iu Mien. Religious practice was created. The three celestial posters were created for Iu Mien of 12 clans to carry to worship in the mountains to mountains. Since the Ming era, Iu Mien lost their kingdom, temples, and territory completely to China. In the year of Jaapc-yienh yietc maux was a drought for three consecutive years, and no food, and starvation severely impacted society. Iu Mien people saw further south across Sea/River lightning and thunder strike signals to Iu Mien in the hope of the rain. Iu Mien people search for new land or forest land territories for farming. All 12 clans of Iu Mien held a meeting and discuss how to move to the new land. They went to Cing Jaang river bank to cut trees to build boats to cross rivers/seas. 12 clans and 12 boats were built to travel across the rivers/sea but the boats were stuck in the big wind storm for three months and could not reach the other side of the river/sea. The boats no longer move on the horizon of the water. They heard strange sounds as a waterfall of the clips, and some said it was thunder. The others said the waterfall off into the ocean sinkhole. The Iu Mien leaders and crew members came up with a worship spirit god called lingh zioz bouz meuh to rescue Iu Mien to reach the other side of the sea/river. The three leaders Bienh liemh feix lorngh, Dangc yungz nyeic lorngc, and Zeuz feix faqc zang to lead the affair/journey. After worship and calling the spirit god to rescue them about three days later, the boats were moving to reach the shore of today as Guangdong province. From there, Iu Mien spread out to Guangv xi, Yunz Namh, Guiz Zio, then to Vietnam, and later to Laos, and Thailand.

The Iu Mien people were the first civilization in China according to the chanting song story, Iu Mien Elders, a shaman's worship book written by Iu Mien elders in ancient Chinese characters. The Iu Mien nation was located in the southern part of China today known as Guangdong, Guangxi, and Hunan provinces and was ruled by the king of the Iu Mien people. The last Iu Mien King was King Pan, the namesake of the modern Iu Mien surnames Phan, Saephanh, Saephan, Phanh, Pharm, Pan, Pham, etc. King Pan and the Chinese emperor declared war against each other 1,000 years ago over disputed territory. Iu Mien, led by King Pan, were fighting to protect their people and their territory. King Pan and Iu Mien suffered tremendous losses. King Pan lost countless soldiers and civilian casualties as well as territory to the Chinese emperor. The Chinese emperor captured most of the Iu Mien's territory. Iu Mien and King Pan were unable to fight due to outnumbered soldiers and weapons, which forced King Pan to negotiate with the Chinese emperor. The Chinese emperor gave two options to King Pan and Iu Mien people: 1) Surrender to the Chinese emperor and sign a treaty to give all territorial land to the Chinese emperor, or 2) King Pan could continue to fight, but the Chinese would wipe out Iu Mien society in a short period. 
King Pan and his government chose to give up all territories to China and signed the treaty called “Passport to travel in the hill” or “Passport to cross the mountain.” This document contained relevant information. The Chinese emperor had written this document in Chinese character. “Iu Mien people have rights to maintain their identity, language, culture, and worship system and live on the hillside or in the mountain to cultivate the land for farming and crops and raise their family. The Iu Mien would not be allowed to form their own government and have no rights to pursue their own nation. Iu Mien, who possesses this document, has the legal rights to cross any territories/ borders to settle and to build their village in the hill/mountain to make a living by farming without delay by any regional governments. The governments of that country are responsible for their wellbeing and educating them to follow the rules of laws of the country that Iu Mien are living in.”

After the loss of their nation, the 12 existing clans of the Iu Mien people had to separate into small villages due to the mountainous area and foothill land. Each village consisted of 15 to 20 families. The majority of people in each village were related. In some cases, they kept their clan together. Their farming lifestyle was slash-and-burn to clear the grass and trees and to fertilize crops. Hunting and fishing were their primary career for men to provide food for their families. They hunt many different kinds of wild animals ranging from birds, squirrels, monkeys, deer, and wild buffalo, to elephants. Iu Mien women's primary role is to take care of household chores and feed animals. Iu Mien's written language is similar to Chinese characters which are for religion and chants only songs. No written language for daily speaking. Every five to ten years, the mountain where the Iu Mien people lived and farmed would no longer be able to grow crops because the slash-and-burn process destroys the proper elements of soils needed to grow crops in the region. They had to move to a new place and location in the deep tropical forest to start a new life and a new village all over again. Iu Mien people were scattered all over the mountains in China. The mountains where they lived became deserts because of the slash and burn to farm. They looked for new places such as other mountainous areas to build new villages. They had to search further south and eventually moved into Vietnam.

Migration from China to Vietnam 
No known record indicates what year the Iu Mien entered Vietnam because of the constant fear of persecution by the Chinese emperor. The method of slash and burn used throughout mountainous regions in China led to a drought which caused the Iu Mien people to migrate to Vietnam. They saw Vietnam as an opportunity to build new villages and cultivate forests for farming. The Iu Mien population gradually migrated into Vietnam, in the province called “Moung Lai.” The lands had rich natural soil. The Iu Mien people were able to produce enough food to support their families. However, the local people persecuted the Iu Mien. When one of the local people died, they brought the dead body to an Iu Mien village and put it in front of the Iu Mien hut house door late at night. At dawn the next morning, the Iu Mien found a dead body in front of their doorstep. They reported this to the local authorities. The local authorities and local people accused the Iu Mien people of murdering the victim. They charged Iu Mien people with all of the wealth they had. In some cases, they charged the Iu Mien capital punishment by hanging to death for a crime that they did not commit. The local government imposed a high tax on Iu Mien families. Each year when a family couldn't afford to pay taxes, the local government would force the Iu Mien people to sell a child to pay the tax due. The Iu Mien families were deteriorated by the government's action and no longer be able to continue to live in Vietnam. They were searching for a new place again. During the 1600s and 1800s, the Iu Mien people found Laos and Thailand. They gradually migrated to Laos and Thailand.

Life in Laos and Thailand 
Since the Iu Mien people had settled in Laos and Thailand, they gained more independence. One group of Iu Mien migrated from Vietnam to Thailand. The other migrated from Vietnam to Laos. They were able to form their own villages and were run by village chiefs. Laos and Thai governments were helping Iu Mien to select their village chiefs to run their village affairs and report to the city mayor and governor about their village's social issues and problems. Iu Mien people were allowed to maintain their culture, identity, language, cultural norms, and ways of Iu Mien's living. Rich Iu Mien families would be able to own a house in the city and send their kids to school. The poor would be able to find land to cultivate for farming without government restrictions. The natural soils of the land were rich. They were free to farm anywhere in the countryside. The Iu Mien people were able to plant crops and be self-sufficient for many generations. The tropical forests in Laos and Thailand have all kinds of wild animals for Iu Mien to hunt for consumption as well as various kinds of tropical fruits and wild vegetables which provide nutrients to the Iu Mien people. The rivers have plenty of fish for Iu Mien to fish for food. They were enjoying life and the environment in Laos and Thailand for many generations until 1960 when the cold war began.

Iu Mien in the war in Laos 
In the 1960s, when the Cold War was occurring between the United States and the Soviet Union with an arms race this caused political unrest in Southeast Asia. The United States spread the free world government system into Vietnam, Laos, and Cambodia. At the same time, the Soviet Union had spread the communist system into Vietnam, Laos, and Cambodia as well. The people within those three countries were also divided and run by two government systems. Civil war broke out. Vietnam was divided into two countries, North Vietnam and South Vietnam; North Vietnam was run by a communist regime led by Ho Chi Minh. South Vietnam was led by the elected Vietnamese President and supported by the United States government. The Vietnam War began. At the same time, Laos and Cambodia also had two government systems, one supported by the United States and the other supported by the Soviet Union Socialist Republic. The civil war began as Vietnam War. The cold war in South East Asia interrupted the lives of Iu Mien society and changed them forever. The United States government sent Central Intelligence Agency (CIA) and military advisors to Laos in support of the Royal Lao government to fight against communists Pathet Lao. They recruited the Iu Mien people as their soldiers to fight against the Lao Communist regime. The war had caused many Iu Mien casualties along with other tribes. Iu Mien soldiers were armed with American-made weapons and dressed in American military uniforms and also funded by American taxpayer dollars. Over a 15-year period, more American bombs were dropped by American planes over Laos than in World War I and World War II combined. Lao citizens became refugees all over Laos. The United States Agency for International Development (USAID) provided aid to the refugees.

By 1975, the Pathet Lao communists had gained complete control over Laos. They captured the Royal Lao high-ranking government officials and sent them to a concentration camp. The majority of them starved to death. The others were sentenced to death by firing squad and others suffered from illness due to malnutrition and also died in the concentration camp. The majority of former elected government officials, ministries, governors, mayors, government workers, and all educators were sent to concentration camps for re-education. In most cases, the Lao communist soldiers, armed with Soviet-made or Chinese-made AK-47s, forced them to work from dawn to dark without food and many starved to death. The majority of Iu Mien was among the Lao communist's enemies due to their involvement with the U.S. CIA operation during the war in Laos. Iu Mien began fleeing the Laos communist regime in mid-1975 into Thailand. These escapes mostly began late at night. While Laos communist troops were sleeping whole villages would be packed with their personal belongings, valuable items, silver bars, jewelry, and food. Everyone had to carry their personal belongings on their backs and walk barefoot. The journey began by walking on a terrain trail and it took about a month to reach the Thai border. During the journey, Iu Mien refugees had encounters with many dangerous consequences. Some stepped on land mines set up by the Laos communist troops and lost their lives without proper burial by their loved ones. They encountered bandits armed with semi-automatic weapons, who took all valuable items from the refugee families. Furthermore, Iu Mien lost many lives by crossing monsoon-flooded rivers. Many family members drowned while crossing the rising river during monsoon season. When the Iu Mien refugees made it to the Thai border, they faced Laos communist persecution. However, the Thai border patrol troops stopped them at the Thai and Lao border. From time to time, the Thai defense Minister closed the border and did not allow refugees to enter Thailand within a certain time.

The refugee camps were funded and set up by the United Nations High Commissioner for Refugees and enforced by Thai authorities. The refugee camps were barbed with metal wire and guarded by Thai soldiers 24 hours a day and 7 days a week. No refugees were allowed to go out of the refugee camp. The living conditions were very poor. There was no running water. There was no clean water to drink or for a shower. Personal hygiene was poor and caused illness. The food was distributed by the UNHCR program but had to go through the Thai authorities before it reached the needy refugees. By that time, the food that got to refugee families was so limited. All refugees were starving and caused malnutrition as well as all kind of illnesses and lost many lives during their stay in the refugee camp.

In 1976, the western governments sent their embassy personnel to interview Lao refugees and process legal documents to allow them to settle in western countries. From 1976 to 1995, 40,000 thousand plus Iu Mien refugees were settled in the United States of America. The majority of Iu Mien people in the U.S. today live in California, Oregon, Washington, Alaska, and North Carolina. Few lives scatter all over the United States due to following jobs, pursuing education, and marriage. The Iu Mien people today are spreading out to the western hemisphere. About 1,500 plus were settled in France. About 400 Iu Mien people were settled in Canada. Few families were settled in Australia and New Zealand. A couple of families had settled in Demark. Each time the Iu Mien migrated into a new country, they have to leave many fellow Iu Mien people behind. The majority of Iu Mien people still remain in China. At least 2 to 3 million Iu Mien are living in China. 500,000 thousand plus Iu Mien are living in Vietnam. About 50,000 thousand plus Iu Mien people are living in Thailand and about 30,000 thousand plus are still remaining in Laos.

Culture

Marriage 
The Iu Mien have a strong family foundation. Marriage norms are strongly preserved in Iu Mien society. When a man feels that his girlfriend is a potential wife, he will ask his parents to set up a meeting with the girl's parents. When the girl's parents accept the invitation to meet and confirm it with the prospective groom's family, they prepare a meal for the boy's family. The prospective groom's parents will ask for his girlfriend's birth date to check if they match each other. If their birth dates match and further discussion goes smoothly, further discussion will take place, the boy will give a silver bracelet to his prospective wife, symbolizing primary engagement. If the girl feels ready to spend the rest of her life with the man who has proposed to her, she will keep the silver bracelet. However, she will make an attempt to return a silver bracelet to her boyfriend at least once so as to test him. This allows the girl to test if the man who has proposed to her truly loves her. In order to pass the test, the boyfriend must bring the silver bracelet back to his girlfriend and ask her to keep it, a request she will accept. The boy will then ask his parents to set up a second appointment to negotiate the girl's dowry and details of the wedding with her parents. There are two types of Iu Mien weddings: small weddings and big wedding ceremonies. The big wedding ranges in cost from $15,000 to $30,000, excluding the dowry, and the small wedding costs between $5,000 to $15,000 without the dowry.

On the wedding day, each set of parents will appoint a master of ceremonies for their child. These figures provide guidance, mentorship, and lectures to prepare the betrothed for married life. The two selected masters of wedding ceremonies are well respected in the Iu Mien community, trained in the Iu Mien religion as master shamans, and prepared to solve social problems. For the groom, the master of ceremonies is called cingh suiv and is responsible for performing a ceremonial chant to alert the groom's god of ancestors that the bride is joining the family. Following this chant, the new ancestor god will protect her from harm and bless the couple with fertility, wealth, and lifelong commitment. For the bride, the master of ceremonies is called muih mienh and is responsible for escorting the bride to the groom's house on the eve of the wedding and chanting in thanks to the bride's god of ancestors, who has cared for the bride from birth until this moment. Following the ceremony, the bride's ancestor god will no longer watch over her as she joins her husband's family.

Iu Mien's family structure is based on a kinship system, meaning that following her marriage, a woman moves to live with her husband's family. In Iu Mien culture, a wife's primary responsibility is to do household chores, the husband's primary responsibility is to provide financial support, and both parents are equally responsible for raising and caring for their children.

Religion

After losing his nation to China, King Pan created a new worship system by worshiping ancestor spirits and a universal god. Due to no permanent place to build temples, King Pan and the shaman/priest had formed art posters consisting of the universal gods including three brothers of Celestials and many universal spirit gods. These poster images can be easily carried when they moved from mountain to mountain without interrupting worshiping. All shaman spiritual books start with King Pan as a founder of the religion and creator. The most important aspect of Iu Mien ancestor worship is when a person died. When a family member has died, they will host a ceremony. Iu Mien people believe a deceased person has two types of spirit/soul. Good and bad spirits need to be properly sent to a certain place. The Iu Mien priest/shaman will perform a ceremony to guide the deceased soul/spirit to the spirit world. The good spirit will be worshiped by his/her children and it can help protect the family from harm and bless a family by many means. The bad spirit will be sent to hell and locked away so it will not be able to come back to haunt family members. The priests/shamans perform a ceremony of chanting for 2–3 days in order to wrap up and complete the deceased spirit and soul and guide each spirit/soul to the right destination of the spirit world so that the evil spirit doesn't come back to haunt family members. The deceased's good spirit/soul becomes a heavenly being and looks after his/her surviving family members on a daily basis.

From time to time, family members will offer chicken and joss paper money to the deceased's good spirit to ask for guidance and protection from harm. At other times, family members dream or have nightmares about the deceased family member. That means the deceased spirit/soul needs help from their living family member so the ancestor god will send a message by dreaming. On the other occasion, ancestor gods will send strange things such as making birds fly into the Iu Mien house. If this signal is received by a family member, the ceremony will take place. By offering chicken and joss paper, the spirit world will gain wealth. In return, god spirit will help the human world to gain all kinds of well-being. Such as a family's business will gain profit, a working person will get paid raises, students have creative ideas to concentrate on study, and a person feels sad without a reason will gain strength and confidence. The ill person will gain energy and get healed/well. Each deceased person gets three times ceremony during his/her children's lifetime, the spirit/soul becomes heaven god and has more power to take good care of his/her children and grandchildren. When Iu Mien priests/shamans chant, they start to tell a story of how King Pan created society, the priest/shaman laminated from King Pan and called King Pan's spirit/soul to bless so that the priest has more power to perform the ceremony well. King Pan was ahead of religion and the head of state when he was a King. Even today, Iu Mien people still believe his spirit/soul has the power to deal with the spirit world and the human world for many good reasons. (Religion storytelling by Saeng Fou Orn Saephanh, the grand priest/Shaman).

Festivals

There are two main holidays that the Iu Mien celebrate, New Year's Day and July 14. New Year's Day for the Iu Mien is the same day as the Chinese Lunar New Year. There is a ritual on the eve of the New Year, in which an Iu Mien family will prepare an offering to their ancestor gods such as a shaman chanting and offering incense, pig, paper, and firewood for the ritual. After the offering by a shaman is over, a pig will be cooked and made into a variety of dishes, and family members, cousins, relatives, and friends will be invited to have a feast together. Eggs dyed red is used for Iu Mien New Year's Day. Eggs at New Year symbolize a blessing to an individual's soul or spirit. The other holiday is July 14, celebrating spirit day. The Iu Mien people believe that the 14th is a day for the entire universe of spirits-gods New Year's Day. In the old days, villagers did not go to work in the fields or farms or do anything related to work outside the house. In every household, the people give credit to the spirit and set them free, the household will offer incense paper to the ancestor spirits for them to buy things in the spirit world. On July 15, the ancestor spirits are traditionally believed to be in every leaf in every tree. People are traditionally forbidden to touch or explore all tree leaves. It is believed that if a person touches a leaf or cuts down a tree this will bother spirits which will cause the individual who did so to become ill. On July 16 it is believed that the whole universe's spirits return to the spirit world so everything in the human world is believed to become normal again.

Iu Mien in the United States today

Today, there are about 30,000 to 50,000 Iu Mien people living in the United States; they adapted well in the industrial country where they learned to obtain job skills and work in the production workforce as well as white-collar jobs in the United States of America. Since Iu Mien people arrived in the United States, they have had the opportunity to go to school and continue their higher education, and be accepted into colleges and universities. Some Iu Mien students are accepted into prestigious colleges such as Yale, Harvard, Princeton, Columbia, and others. There are more and more Iu Mien who have graduated with doctorates and law degrees and joined the professional workforce and contributed their services to society. Many have graduated with master's degrees and undergraduate degrees and have joined the workforce in many fields such as the private sector, public sector, and small business entrepreneurs. Furthermore, in 2012, the first Iu Mien was elected into public office as the city council in San Pablo, California. Overall, Iu Mien people have made progress and catching up with the majority in mainstream society and assimilating into American dominant culture well. However, there are many social issues and problems facing the Iu Mien communities in the United States as well. Many Iu Mien people are still poor and living at the poverty level.

Challenges faced by the Iu Mien in the United States today

There are many social problems facing the Iu Mien American community throughout the United States today. The first generation {first wave of arrival to America} of Iu Mien Americans suffered the most because of culture shock and the language barrier. America is not their preferred place to live because they do not know and understand the culture, language, and modern social system. The other factor that first-generation Iu Mien American in the U.S. is facing is education and job skill. A large proportion of the first generation of Iu Mien Americans are unemployed and depend on government social service programs to survive. Therefore, government funding for social service programs is vital to provide benefits to them in order to sustain their family together. The English class and basic job training for the first generation of Iu Mien Americans are essential for them to gain proficiency in English and job skill to join the workforce to build self-sufficiency. Because of the US, CIA's operation in Laos and at the end of the war, Iu Mien along with the U.S. CIA lost the war and forces them to abandon their village, properties, and land behind in Laos. Suddenly, they came to America with nothing. Now, they have to learn everything all over again. Culture shock is the hardest for the first generation of Iu Mien Americans to adapt to in America. Parents and kids are often confrontational with each other the minor social problem can potentially escalate the matter into a major battlefield within the family. Kids have a chance to go to school and learn to be American and adapted quickly. Kids want to listen to pop music and dress in a modern style as well as exercise their freedom of expression toward their parents. Parents see that their kids are not respecting them and see their kids associated with deviant behavior which often causes major arguments within the family. The cause has an enormous impact on the first generation of Iu Mien Americans and leads to emotional stress, loneliness, and mental illness. Iu Mien Community needs financial resources from the government to address mental health problems tremendously. The other social problem that the first generation of Iu Mien Americans faces is illegal drug users. When they're confronted with social problems such as spousal conflict, and parents and children conflict, they do not know how to cope with the stress. Using illegal drugs to relieve stress and emotion is the primary factor in illegal drug addiction. The other factor contributing to drug addiction was that they believe illegal drugs such as opium can cure chronic illness so instead of going to see a doctor, they use the illegal drug to slow down the chronic pain. They often do not trust modern medical doctors. As consequence, some of the first Iu Mien Americans were addicted to illegal drugs. The third major social problem is alcohol and gambling because of the lack of social activities for them to participate in, and isolation is the main cause of first Iu Mien Americans becoming alcoholics and gamblers. Iu Mien Communities lack financial resources and programs to address the social problem within Iu Mien Communities. Therefore, the government programs allocate funding to Iu Mien Community is essential and vital for their basic survival.

Due to rapid cultural adaptation, the second generation of Iu Mien Americans is less impoverished and societally disadvantaged than their parents. Using the financial foundations created by their parents, most second-generation Iu Mien Americans are capable of further educating themselves, and ranking higher in the workplace compared to their predecessors. Most second-generation Iu Mien Americans don’t have children yet, as this generation is still nearing their reproductive years.

See also
The Art of Not Being Governed

References

External links
LearnMien.com

Yao people
Ethnic groups officially recognized by China
Ethnic groups in Myanmar
Ethnic groups in Thailand
Ethnic groups in Vietnam